Eagles Claw or Eagle's Claw may refer to:

 Eagle's Claw, 1978 Chinese language martial arts film made in Hong Kong
 Eagle's Claw (Lightwater Valley), amusement ride in Yorkshire, UK
 Eagles Claw Nature Reserve, NSW, Australia

See also
 Eagle claw (disambiguation)